Countess Walburga of Egmont ( – 7 March 1529), was a Countess from the House of Egmond and through marriage Countess of Nassau-Siegen.

Biography
Walburga was born  as the eldest daughter of Count John III of Egmont and Countess Magdalene of Werdenberg (from the House of Werdenberg).

Walburga met her future husband, William I of Nassau-Siegen (Dillenburg, 10 April 1487 – Dillenburg, 6 October 1559), in Arnhem in 1505, where he accompanied Elector Frederick III ‘the Wise’ of Saxony. The following year, the marriage was arranged at Siegen with a messenger from Walburga’s father. 

The marriage was consummated at Koblenz on 29 May 1506. The glorious wedding was attended by the archbishops Herman IV of Cologne and John II of Trier and many other guests from the high nobility. Henry, the groom’s brother, had come over from the Netherlands. 

Shortly before, on 16 February 1506, the ʻBeilagerʼ of William’s sisters Elisabeth and Mary, who married the counts  and Jobst I of Holstein-Schauenburg-Pinneberg repectively, was celebrated in Dillenburg with the greatest of festivities. The purchase of gold fabric for 747 guilders and silk fabric for 396 guilders at the trade fair in Mainz for these celebrations, as well as the unusually high total expenditure of 13,505 guilders in the accounts of 1505/1506, show that these weddings must have been splendid events. Soon after the wedding, William set up his own court at Dillenburg Castle.

In 1516, following the death of his father Count John V of Nassau-Siegen, William succeeded him as Count of Nassau-Siegen and of half Diez. Since then William and Walburga had their Residenz in Siegen.

Walburga died on 7 March 1529 and was buried next to her eldest daughter in the crypt of St. John’s Church in the Franciscan monastery in Siegen, which her father-in-law had founded.

William’s brother Henry suggested the widower to look for a new life companion in the highest princely houses and suggested a princess of Lorraine, ʻdie ein gut heiratgut mitbrächteʼ (‘who brought in a rich marital estate’). Instead William remarried in Siegen on 20 September 1531 to Countess Juliane of Stolberg-Wernigerode (Stolberg, 15 February 1506 – Dillenburg, 18 June 1580).

Issue
From the marriage of Walburga and William, the following children were born:
 Elisabeth (Siegen, October 1515 – Siegen (?), January 1523).
 Magdalene (Siegen, 6 October 1522 – 18 August 1567), married on 16 July 1538 to Count  (1514 – 4 December 1578).

Notes

References

Sources
 
 
 
 
 
 
 
 
 
 
 
 
  (1882). Het vorstenhuis Oranje-Nassau. Van de vroegste tijden tot heden (in Dutch). Leiden: A.W. Sijthoff/Utrecht: J.L. Beijers.

External links
 Nassau. In: Medieval Lands. A prosopography of medieval European noble and royal families, by Charles Cawley.
 Nassau Part 4. In: An Online Gotha, by Paul Theroff.

|-

Egmont, Walburga
Countesses of Nassau
House of Egmond
∞
Egmont, Walburga
Egmont, Walburga
Egmont, Walburga